KCPI (94.9 FM, "94.9 The Breeze") is a radio station broadcasting an adult contemporary format. Licensed to Albert Lea, Minnesota, United States, the station serves the Albert Lea-Austin area. The station is currently owned by Alpha Media, through licensee Digity 3E License, LLC.

References

External links
KCPI official website

Radio stations in Minnesota
Mainstream adult contemporary radio stations in the United States
Radio stations established in 1983
1983 establishments in Minnesota
Alpha Media radio stations